The 1952–55 Nordic Football Championship was the sixth tournament staged. Four Nordic countries participated: Denmark, Finland, Norway and Sweden. Sweden won the tournament, its fourth Nordic Championship win.

Results

1952

1953

1954

1955

Table
'Two points for a victory, one point for a draw, no points for a loss.

Winners

Statistics

Goalscorers

See also
 Balkan Cup
 Baltic Cup
 Central European International Cup
 Mediterranean Cup

References

1952-55
1952–53 in European football
1953–54 in European football
1954–55 in European football
1955–56 in European football
1952–53 in Swedish football
1953–54 in Swedish football
1954–55 in Swedish football
1955–56 in Swedish football
1952–53 in Danish football
1953–54 in Danish football
1954–55 in Danish football
1955–56 in Danish football
1952 in Norwegian football
1953 in Norwegian football
1954 in Norwegian football
1955 in Norwegian football
1952 in Finnish football
1953 in Finnish football
1954 in Finnish football
1955 in Finnish football